Achlya tateyamai is a moth in the family Drepanidae. It was described by Inoue in 1982. It is found in Japan (Hokkaido).

References

Moths described in 1982
Thyatirinae
Moths of Japan